The 2015–16 Big Ten men's basketball season began with practices in October 2015, followed by the start of the 2015–16 NCAA Division I men's basketball season in November. Conference play began in late December and concluded in March, 2016.

Indiana won the Big Ten regular season by two games over second place Michigan State. Four teams tied for third place.

Denzel Valentine was the Conference Player of the Year and won many national player of the year awards (splitting them with Buddy Hield). Valentine and Jarrod Uthoff were consensus All-Americans, while Yogi Ferrell also received some All-American recognition. Uthoff was named Academic All-America Team Member of the Year, while Shavon Shields and Mike Gessell were also named Academic All-America. Tom Crean was named Big Ten Coach of the Year.

Following the season, Tom Izzo was elected to the Naismith Memorial Basketball Hall of Fame.  After taking over for Bo Ryan midseason, Greg Gard was named the Jim Phelan National Coach of the Year Award winner.

The Big Ten tournament was held from March 9–13, 2016 at Bankers Life Fieldhouse in Indianapolis, Indiana. Michigan State won the tournament championship by defeating Purdue in the championship game. As a result, the Spartans received the conference's automatic bid to the NCAA tournament.

Seven Big Ten schools (Michigan State, Indiana, Maryland, Purdue, Iowa, Wisconsin, and Michigan) were invited to the NCAA Tournament marking the sixth consecutive year the Big ten had at least six teams in the Tournament. The conference sent three teams to the Sweet Sixteen (Indiana, Maryland, and Wisconsin), marking the ninth consecutive season multiple Big Ten teams advanced to the Sweet Sixteen. In the previous four seasons, at least one Big Ten team reached the Final Four, however no Big Ten team made it past the Sweet Sixteen. The conference achieved an 8–7 record in the Tournament. Ohio State also received a bid to the National Invitation Tournament, losing in the first round.

Nine Big Ten teams won 20 games on the season marking the first time in history this occurred.

Head coaches

Notes: 
 Year at school includes 2015–16 season.
 Overall and Big Ten records are from time at current school and are before the beginning of the season. 
 Turgeon's ACC conference record excluded since Maryland began Big Ten Conference play in 2014–15
 On December 16, 2015, following a win versus Texas A&M–Corpus Christi, Bo Ryan officially retired as head coach of Wisconsin. Greg Gard took over on interim basis.

Preseason

In late October some schools celebrated Midnight Madness. The Big Ten teams would begin their seasons between November 13 and 15.

According to the Big Ten media, Melo Trimble was the preseason conference player of the year and he was joined on the All-Big Ten preseason team by James Blackmon, Jr., Yogi Ferrell, Jarrod Uthoff, Jake Layman, Caris LeVert, Denzel Valentine, A. J. Hammons, Nigel Hayes, and Bronson Koenig. Valentine, Hammons, Hayes and Trimble were all unanimous selections. According to the Big Ten Network, the preseason All-Big Ten team was composed of Trimble, Ferrell, Hayes, LeVert, and Valentine. Trimble, Ferrell, and Hayes were unanimous.

Preseason watchlists
Below is a table of notable preseason watch lists. 

The following players were selected to the 5 major positional preseason 20-man watch lists announced by the Naismith Memorial Basketball Hall of Fame:
Bob Cousy Award (point guard): Yogi Ferrell, Melo Trimble, and Bronson Koenig
Jerry West Award (shooting guard): James Blackmon, Jr., Rasheed Sulaimon, and Caris LeVert
Julius Erving Award (small forward): Troy Williams, Jake Layman, Denzel Valentine and Nigel Hayes
Karl Malone Award (power forward): Caleb Swanigan
Kareem Abdul-Jabbar Award (center): Thomas Bryant, Diamond Stone and A. J. Hammons

Ferrell, Hayes, Valentine and Trimble were selected to the 30-man Lute Olson Award preseason watchlist.

Blackmon, Ferrel, Hammons, Hayes, Koenig, Layman, LeVert, Trimble, Valentine and Williams all made the initial 50-man John R. Wooden Award watch list on November 17. On December 2, the 50-man Naismith College Player of the Year watchlist, 33-man Robertson Trophy watchlist and 18-man Wayman Tisdale Award watchlist were announced.  Naismith honorees were Ferrel, Hammons, Hayes, LeVert, Swanigan, Trimble, and Valentine. Robertson honorees were Ferrel, Hayes, LeVert, Trimble, and Valentine. Swanigan was the lone Tisdale honoree from the Big Ten. Iowa's Mike Gesell, Maryland's Varun Ram, Michigan's Spike Albrecht, Nebraska's Shavon Shields, Purdue's Rapheal Davis, Rutgers' Greg Lewis and Wisconsin's Hayes were named Allstate Good Works Team nominees.

Preseason All-American teams

On October 6, CBS Sports announced its preseason All-American team, which included Trimble and Hayes on its 2nd team and Valentine on its 3rd team. Sporting News selected Hayes to its preseason All-American first team, Ferrell to its second team, and Trimble to its third team. Trimble was an Athlon Sports Preseason All-American 1st team selection, while Hayes, Ferrell and LeVert were 3rd team selections. Lindy's Sports did not name an All-America team, but did rank all college basketball players by position and presented a top 25 list at each position. It included Hayes as the top power forward and Trimble as the third best point guard. Hayes, Valentine and Trimble were second team selections by Sports Illustrated. On November 3, NBC Sports included Valentine and Trimble on its preseason All-American 2nd team. Trimble, Ferrell and Hayes were 1st, 2nd and 3rd team selections respectively by USA Today. Trimble, Valentine and Hayes were all third team selections by Bleacher Report. Trimble was one vote shy of tying Ben Simmons for the fifth and final spot on the Associated Press pre-season All-American team. No Big Ten player made the Blue Ribbon College Basketball Yearbook preseason All-America first team.

Preseason polls

Maryland was the unanimous selection by the Big Ten Network to top the preseason conference rankings.

The Big Ten had 5 teams ranked in the preseason Coaches' Poll (Maryland at No. 3, No. 13 Michigan State, No. 15 Indiana, No. 17 Wisconsin and Purdue, which was tied for No. 24) and six in the preseason AP Poll (Maryland at No. 3, No. 13 Michigan State, No. 15 Indiana, No. 17 Wisconsin, No. 23 Purdue and No. 25 Michigan).

According to Athlon Sports, the preseason top 25 included Maryland (No. 4), Michigan State (No. 12), Purdue (No. 16), Indiana (No. 17), Wisconsin (No. 19), and Michigan (No. 22). CBS Sports listed Maryland (No. 4), Michigan State (No. 11), Indiana (No. 13), Wisconsin (No. 17), and Purdue (No. 26) in its preseason rankings. Sporting News ranked five Big Ten Teams among its Top 25: Indiana (No. 3), Indiana (No. 15), Michigan (No. 18), Wisconsin (No. 20) and Michigan State (No. 23). Lindy's Sports ranked Maryland number 1, Indiana number 4, Purdue number 21 and Michigan State number 23 in its top 25. Michigan was among the other 15 teams mentioned (at number 33). NBC Sports ranked Maryland 2, Michigan State 9, Indiana 14, Michigan 17, Purdue 21 and Wisconsin 25. ESPN's 10-person panel selected Maryland number 1, Indiana 14, Michigan State 15, Wisconsin 17, Michigan 22, and Purdue 24. Sports Illustrated ranked all 351 teams. The following teams were in its top 25: Maryland 5, Indiana 14, and Michigan State 15 (but also listed 3 Big Ten teams in positions 26–28). Bleacher Report ranked Maryland 4, Indiana 12, Michigan State 13 and Purdue 18. Blue Ribbon College Basketball Yearbook selected Maryland 2, Indiana 13, Michigan State 15, Michigan 17 and Purdue 19. The United States Basketball Writers Association (USBWA) ranked 1. Maryland (8); 13. Indiana; 15. Michigan State; 18. Purdue; 23. Michigan; and 25. Wisconsin.

Regular season

Conference schedules
Before the season, it was announced that the Big Ten Network would televise 75 games including 9 straight Wednesday doubleheaders and regular Saturday and Sunday doubleheaders. The schedule also included an extensive slate of ESPN Inc. family of networks (ESPN, ESPN2 and ESPNU) Tuesday and Thursday night of the conference season coverage and CBS Sports scheduled games for Saturday or Sunday afternoons starting January 10, 2016. CBS will carry the semifinals and finals of the 2016 Big Ten Conference men's basketball tournament, marking the 19th consecutive year that they have covered the Big Ten Conference men's basketball tournament. All teams begin a balanced 18-game conference game schedule during the week of December 28 – January 3 in which teams play home and away against 5 teams, home against 4 teams and away against the remaining 4 opponents. On January 30, the conference scheduled its inaugural annual "Super Saturday – College Hoops & Hockey" doubleheader featuring a basketball game between Michigan and Penn State followed by a hockey game between the teams from the same schools at Madison Square Garden.

Rankings

The Big Ten had 5 teams ranked (Indiana, Maryland, Michigan State, Purdue, and Wisconsin) and 3 others (Iowa, Michigan, and Ohio State) receiving votes in the preseason Coaches' Poll. It had 6 teams ranked (Indiana, Maryland, Michigan, Michigan State, Purdue, and Wisconsin)in the preseason AP Poll and 1 other (Iowa) receiving votes. Wisconsin dropped from the ranking by Week 2, while Michigan dropped in Week 3, and Indiana went unranked in Week 4. Michigan State ascended to the number 1 ranking in the fifth week of the season and has retained the number 1 ranking for three consecutive weeks.

*AP does not release post-NCAA tournament rankings

Players of the week
Throughout the conference regular season, the Big Ten offices named one or two players of the week and one or two freshmen of the week each Monday.

On November 17 in the Champions Classic, Denzel Valentine led Michigan State over Kansas by posting the first triple-double of the 2015–16 NCAA Division I men's basketball season with 29 points, 12 rebounds and 12 assists. On January 5, Diamond Stone was named national freshman of the week by the United States Basketball Writers Association.

Conference matrix
This table summarizes the head-to-head results between teams in conference play. Each team played 18 conference games, and at least 1 against each opponent.

Midseason watchlists
LeVert, Trimble, Uthoff and Valentine were among the 25 players included in the Wooden Award Midseason Top 25 Watch List on January 13. On January 19, 30 Senior CLASS Award candidates were named including Rapheal Davis, Mike Gesell, Shavon Shields, and Valentine. The January 25, 20-man Oscar Robertson Trophy midseason watch list included Ferrell, Trimble, Uthoff, and Valentine, while the 10-man Integris Wayman Tisdale Award midseason watch lists named Stone and Swanigan. On February 1, Ferrell and Trimble were among the 10 mid-season finalists for the Cousy Award. On February 2, Malcolm Hill and Levert were among the 10 mid-season finalists for the West Award. On February 3, Valentine and Hayes were among the 10 mid-season finalists for the Erving Award. On February 5, Hammons was among the 10 mid-season finalists for the Jabbar Award. Shavon Shields was named an Allstate NABC Good Works Team selections on February 9. Mike Gesell, Jarrod Uthoff, Colby Wollenman and Shavon Shields were named 2015-16 CoSIDA Academic-All District selections on February 11, making it two straight seasons that each was among the 40 finalists for the 15-man Academic All-America team. On that same day Ferrell, Hammons, Trimble, Uthoff and Valentine were included in the Naismith Award Late season Top 35 Watch List. Ferrell, Trimble, Uthoff and Valentine were included in the Wooden Award Late season Top 20 Watch List on February 12. On the same day, Tom Izzo, Bo Ryan and Lefty Driesell were named finalists for the Naismith Memorial Basketball Hall of Fame. On February 18, Valentine was named one of 10 senior finalists for the 2015-16 Senior CLASS Award. On February 29, Valentine and Uthoff were among the 11 finalists for the Robertson Trophy. Valentine was named one of four finalists for the Naismith Player of the Year Trophy on March 20, while Crean was named one of four finalist for Naismith Coach of the Year. Valentine and Ferrell were among the 10 finalist for the Wooden Award on March 29.

Honors and awards
Michigan State Spartans men's basketball's Tom Izzo was elected to the Naismith Memorial Basketball Hall of Fame. After taking over for Bo Ryan midseason, Greg Gard was named the Jim Phelan National Coach of the Year Award winner.

Valentine earned numerous National Player of the Year awards: NABC Player of the Year, Basketball Times, Sports Illustrated, USA Today, and NBC Sports. He earned the Senior CLASS Award as the outstanding senior student-athlete in Division I men's basketball. Valentine was recognized as the Julius Erving Small Forward of the Year Award winner. He also earned the Lute Olson Award as the most outstanding non-freshman men's college basketball player in NCAA Division I competition.

Uthoff was named Academic All-America Team Member of the Year and was joined on the Academic All-America first team by Shields. Gessell was named to the second team.

Valentine, Uthoff and Ferrell received broad support as 2016 NCAA Men's Basketball All-Americans. USA Today and ESPN named Valentine (1st team), Ferrell (2nd team) and Uthoff (3rd team) All-Americans. NBC Sports and Sporting News selected Valentine (1st team), Ferrell (2nd team) and Uthoff (2nd team). USBWA named Valentine a first team selection and Uthoff a second team selection. Sports Illustrated named Valentine a first team selection and Ferrell, Uthoff and Trimble as honorable mentions. NABC and Associated Press named Valentine to their first teams and Ferrell and Uthoff to their third teams.  CBS Sports selected Valentine to its first team and Ferrell to its third team.

With an average attendance of 12,555 fans per game, including home games and the 2016 Big Ten Men's Basketball Tournament, the Big Ten Conference led the nation in men's basketball attendance for the 40th consecutive season according to the NCAA.

All-Big Ten Awards and Teams
On March 7, The Big Ten announced most of its conference awards. Valentine was also named the Big Ten Athlete of the Year on June 22.

NABC
The National Association of Basketball Coaches announced their Division I All-District teams on March 25, recognizing the nation's best men's collegiate basketball student-athletes. Selected and voted on by member coaches of the NABC, the selections on this list were then eligible for NABC Coaches' All-America Honors. The following list represented the District 7 players chosen to the list.

First Team
Jarrod Uthoff, Iowa
Denzel Valentine, Michigan    State
Yogi Ferrell, Indiana
A. J. Hammons, Purdue
Melo Trimble, Maryland

Second Team
Nigel Hayes, Wisconsin
Peter Jok, Iowa
Malcolm Hill, Illinois
Matt Costello, Michigan    State
Robert Carter, Maryland

USBWA
On March 8, the U.S. Basketball Writers Association released its 2015–16 Men's All-District Teams, based upon voting from its national membership. There were nine regions from coast to coast, and a player and coach of the year were selected in each. The following lists all the Big Ten representatives selected within their respective regions.

District II (NY, NJ, DE, DC, PA, WV)
none

District III (VA, NC, SC, MD)
Melo Trimble, Maryland

District V (OH, IN, IL, MI, MN, WI)
Player of the Year
Denzel Valentine, Michigan State
Coach of the Year
Tom Crean, Indiana
All-District Team
Yogi Ferrell, Indiana
Bryn Forbes, Michigan State
A. J. Hammons, Purdue
Nigel Hayes, Wisconsin
Malcolm Hill, Illinois
Denzel Valentine, Michigan State

District VI (IA, MO, KS, OK, NE, ND, SD)
Peter Jok, Iowa
Jarrod Uthoff, Iowa

Postseason

Big Ten tournament

NCAA tournament

The Big Ten Conference had seven bids to the 2016 NCAA Men's Division I Basketball Tournament.

National Invitation tournament 

Ohio State earned the lone NIT bid for the conference.

2016 NBA Draft

The following all-conference selections were listed as seniors or graduate students: Yogi Ferrell, Denzel Valentine, Jarrod Uthoff, A. J. Hammons, Bryn Forbes, Shavon Shields, Matt Costello and Brandon Taylor. The following players were invited to the NBA Draft Combine: Robert Carter, Deyonta Davis, Hammons, Jake Layman, Caris LeVert, Diamond Stone, Caleb Swanigan, Melo Trimble, Valentine, Nigel Hayes, and Troy Williams.

Notes

References